Draustiniai is a village in Kėdainiai district municipality, in Kaunas County, in central Lithuania. According to the 2011 census, the village was uninhabited. It is located between the Dotnuvėlė river and Vilnius-Šiauliai railway.

Demography

References

Villages in Kaunas County
Kėdainiai District Municipality